Yris Jetty Dirk de Beule (born 23 April 1996 in Cirebon), better known as Irish Bella, is an Indonesian actress, model, and singer, best known for her roles in the films Love in Perth (2010), and Heart 2 Heart (2010), and the soap operas Jawara, Jakarta Love Story, Rajawali, and Binar Bening Berlian. She was nominated at the Indonesian Movie Actors Awards in 2017.

References 

1996 births
Living people
Indonesian actresses

Indo people
Indonesian people of Malay descent